Cliff Meely (July 10, 1947 – May 29, 2013) was an American basketball player who played five seasons in the National Basketball Association (NBA). He played one year at Northeastern Junior College in Sterling, Colorado, then at the University of Colorado Boulder for three years, from 1968 to 1971.  He remains the Colorado Buffaloes' career leader in points per game and rebounds per game.  Meely was a Big Eight all-conference performer all three years at Colorado, and was a first-team All American as a senior.  He is one of only three Colorado basketball player to have his number retired.

He was drafted by the Houston Rockets in the 1971 NBA draft. He played for the Rockets for five years, before being traded to the Los Angeles Lakers in his last NBA season.  He went on to play two years in Europe before recurring back spasms forced his retirement. His best season statistically was his rookie season, when he averaged 9.9 points and 6.6 rebounds per games. Meely died at a Boulder, Colorado hospital in 2013 of a blood infection. He was 65.

References

External links
Profile – TheDraftReview.com
Profile – Basketball-Reference.com

1947 births
2013 deaths
African-American basketball players
All-American college men's basketball players
American expatriate basketball people in France
American expatriate basketball people in Italy
American men's basketball players
Basketball players from Mississippi
Colorado Buffaloes men's basketball players
FC Mulhouse Basket players
Houston Rockets players
Junior college men's basketball players in the United States
Los Angeles Lakers players
Nuova AMG Sebastiani Basket Rieti players
People from Rosedale, Mississippi
Power forwards (basketball)
San Diego Rockets draft picks
20th-century African-American sportspeople
21st-century African-American people
Infectious disease deaths in Colorado
Deaths from blood disease